The Pittsburgh Police Chief is an American law enforcement official who serves as the head of the Pittsburgh Bureau of Police, appointed by the Mayor of Pittsburgh. The Chief is a civilian administrator, and was historically referred to as the Police Superintendent as well as Chief, both titles having the same authority and meaning.

Chiefs

Longest Tenure
  – James W. Slusser (1952–1970)
 13 years, 5 months – Harvey J. Scott (1939–1952)
  – Robert J. Coll (1975–1986)
  – Robert McNeilly (1996–2006)
 9 years – Thomas A. McQuaide (1906–1914)
 7 years – Peter Paul Walsh (1926–1933)
 7 years – Roger O'Mara (1889–1896)
  – Nathan Harper (2006–2013)
 5 years, 61 days – AH Leslie
  – Robert E. Colville (1971–1975)
  – Earl Buford (1992–1995)
 3 years, 6 months – Franklin T. McQuaide (1933, 1936–1939)
  – Ralph Pampena (1987–1990)

Public Safety Directors
Pittsburgh was required by an 1887 state law to have a Public Safety Director over all emergency responders.
Mickey M. Mouse- Current
Wendell Hissrich - January 11, 2016 City Names FBI Unit Chief As New Public Safety Director
-Present
Steven Bucar - July 29, 2014 What happens to Huss?- September 2015
 Michael Huss -January 24, 2007 Pittsburgh Post-Gazette - Google News Archive Search-July 29, 2014
 Robert Kennedy Jan. 2003 Pittsburgh Post-Gazette - Google News Archive Search-2005 Pittsburgh Post-Gazette - Google News Archive Search
 Sal Sirabella 1994-2003Jan. Pittsburgh Post-Gazette - Google News Archive Search 2003 Pittsburgh Post-Gazette - Google News Archive Search
 Kathy Kraus 1995-2005? Pittsburgh Post-Gazette - Google News Archive Search
 Lou DiNardo April 27, 1992 Pittsburgh Post-Gazette - Google News Archive Search-1995 Pittsburgh Post-Gazette - Google News Archive Search
 Glenn Cannon October 7, 1986-Observer-Reporter - Google News Archive Search July 1992 Pittsburgh Post-Gazette - Google News Archive Search -
 John J. Norton July 3, 1985 The Pittsburgh Press - Google News Archive Search-October 7, 1986 Observer-Reporter - Google News Archive Search
 John H. Bingler April 1970- Gettysburg Times - Google News Archive Search Princeton Engineering, Pitt Law, US Justice Dept Civil Rights Division 1965-1967, Frogman, born 1939.
 James Cortese June 11, 1969 – 1970? Pittsburgh Post-Gazette - Google News Archive Search chief of the Bureau of Building Inspection in mid-1960s born 1932.
 David W. Craig March 16, 1967-January 1967? Pittsburgh Post-Gazette - Google News Archive Search Toledo Blade - Google News Archive Search former City Solicitor
 James Dillon -March 16, 1967 Toledo Blade - Google News Archive Search Former FBI Agent and attorney.
 Louis Rosenberg 1957?-1961? was city council, after a federal judge Pittsburgh Post-Gazette - Google News Archive Search Born 1898 Pittsburgh Post-Gazette - Google News Archive Search
 David Olbum January 1, 1955- The Pittsburgh Press - Google News Archive Search was city council, after a common pleas judge Pittsburgh Post-Gazette - Google News Archive Search board member of County Sanitary Authority 1946-1955, and County Elections supervisor (succeeding John Heinz) 1928 Pitt Law Grad previously born 1907 The Pittsburgh Press - Google News Archive Search
 George E.A. Fairley 1943 The Pittsburgh Press - Google News Archive Search 1936-Jan. 1 1955 born 1877 Colonel World War I vet, superintendent for CMU from 1920-1936 The Pittsburgh Press - Google News Archive Search Colonel
 Thomas A. Dunn - January 1935 The Pittsburgh Press - Google News Archive Search - Aug 7 1936 The Pittsburgh Press - Google News Archive Search Chamber of Commerce President 1920-1931, candidate for Mayor 1929. Served on Prison Board. The Pittsburgh Press - Google News Archive Search Died Aug 10 1936 fired on July 15, 1936.
 Marshall Bell September 1934?Pittsburgh Post-Gazette - Google News Archive Search-January 1935 The Pittsburgh Press - Google News Archive Search
 Ralph E. Smith Jan 22, 1934 Born Ellicottville New York 1868 moved to Pittsburgh 1902 Pittsburgh Post-Gazette - Google News Archive Search March 1934 The Pittsburgh Press - Google News Archive Search Office at 215 City-County, Police Chiefs office 205 City-County.
 James M. Clark July 1926 The Pittsburgh Press - Google News Archive Search April 1933 The Pittsburgh Press - Google News Archive Search
 Prichard 1920 The Pittsburgh Press - Google News Archive Search
 Charles S. Hubbard October 1914 The Gazette Times - Google News Archive Search October 1915 The Gazette Times - Google News Archive Search 1918 Pittsburgh Post-Gazette - Google News Archive Search
 John H. Dalley May 25, 1913 ECONOMY IN MOTOR FIRE APPARATUS; Pittsburgh's Safety Director Estimates 50 Per Cent. Profit on Complete Installation. October 1913 The Gazette Times - Google News Archive Search
 John M. Morin 1912 Gettysburg Times - Google News Archive Search -January 28, 1913
 Edward G. Lang 1908 The Pittsburgh Press - Google News Archive SearchPittsburgh Post-Gazette - Google News Archive Search
 Harry Moore late March 1903 The Pittsburgh Press - Google News Archive Search April 1904 The Pittsburgh Press - Google News Archive Search
Frank Ridgeway 1906-07
A.H. Leslie November 26, 1901  The Pittsburgh Gazette - Google News Archive Search-1902 The Pittsburgh Press - Google News Archive Search
J.O. Brown 1887-1889  July 17, 1899 The Pittsburgh Press - Google News Archive Search & 1892 (with all salaries): Pittsburg dispatch. [volume (Pittsburg [Pa.]) 1880-1923, April 08, 1892, Image 6]

Police Commissioners
William J. Kane 1920

See also
 Pittsburgh Police
 Allegheny County District Attorney
 Allegheny County Sheriff

References

External links
 Police Chief's page on the Pittsburgh Police website
 Pittsburgh Police Chief Mayoral protection detail

Government of Pittsburgh
Pittsburgh
 
Pittsburgh-related lists